TESC may refer to

An abbreviation for two US colleges:

 The Evergreen State College, in Olympia, Washington
 Thomas Edison State College, in Trenton, New Jersey

Venues:
Tampere Exhibition and Sports Centre